Dodd Nunatak is a nunatak  west of Mount Cox in the northwest portion of the Emlen Peaks in the Usarp Mountains, a major mountain range within Victoria Land, Antarctica. The geographical feature was first mapped by the United States Geological Survey from surveys and U.S. Navy air photos, 1960–63, and was named by the Advisory Committee on Antarctic Names for Walter H. Dodd of the Public Information Office, National Science Foundation, who worked at McMurdo Station, Hut Point Peninsula, Ross Island, in the 1966–67 and 1967–68 austral summer months. The nunatak lies situated on the Pennell Coast, a portion of Antarctica lying between Cape Williams and Cape Adare.

References 

Nunataks of Victoria Land
Pennell Coast